The 1994 International Damen Grand Prix Leipzig was a women's tennis tournament played on indoor carpet courts at the Messehalle 7 in Leipzig in Germany that was part of the Tier II category of the 1994 WTA Tour. It was the fifth edition of the tournament and was held from 26 September through 2 October 1994. Second-seeded Jana Novotná won the singles title and earned $80,000 first-prize money.

Finals

Singles
 Jana Novotná defeated  Mary Pierce 7–5, 6–1
 It was Novotna's 1st singles title of the year and the 8th of her career.

Doubles
 Patty Fendick /  Meredith McGrath defeated  Manon Bollegraf /  Larisa Savchenko 6–4, 6–4
 It was Fendick's 5th doubles title of the year and the 25th of her career. It was McGrath's 7th doubles title of the year and the 16th of her career.

References

External links
 ITF tournament edition details
 Tournament draws

Sparkassen Cup
Sparkassen Cup (tennis)
1994 in German tennis